Happy Nation is the debut studio album by Swedish pop group Ace of Base. It was initially released in Denmark on 2 November 1992 by Mega Records. During development of the record, the group was heavily influenced by a Jamaican reggae band residing in a nearby studio. For a release in North America, Japan and some Latin American countries, the album  was retitled The Sign with a heavily revised track listing and three new tracks. To coincide with this, Happy Nation was reissued with the new tracks in other territories as Happy Nation (U.S. Version). In 1995, Guinness Book of World Records named the LP the best-selling debut studio effort in music history, at more than 19 million copies sold worldwide. By 1998, Happy Nation/The Sign had sold approximately 21 million units including 9 million in the US alone. Happy Nation/The Sign is one of the best-selling albums of all time.

Background and release
Speaking with Music & Media magazine about the album, Metronome Records managing director Albert Slendebroek said of the album:

Following its initial release in Denmark in November 1992, Happy Nation was gradually released across Europe throughout 1993; first in Norway in January, then in Sweden and Germany in February, and in the UK in June.  It would also be released in Africa, and Latin America, and reached the number one position in at least 10 countries.

Happy Nation (U.S. Version) came on 22 November 1993 to coincide with the album's release in North America under the title The Sign. This edition included the new tracks "The Sign", "Living in Danger", and the Tina Turner cover "Don't Turn Around", along with a remix of "Waiting for Magic" and a version of "Voulez-Vous Danser" with revised vocals. It also included the new track "Hear Me Calling", which did not appear on The Sign. The songs "Münchhausen (Just Chaos)" and "Dimension of Depth" from the original album were removed altogether. The new version of the album was released in the UK on 14 March 1994, and climbed to number 1 on the UK Albums Chart on 26 June, beating the number 21 peak of the original release.

In 2016, Russian label Mirumir released an "Ultimate Edition" on vinyl  containing the original track list from the 1992 release, the additional tracks from The Sign/Happy Nation (U.S. Version) releases and the iTunes bonuses from the three releases.

Critical reception
Alan Jones from Music Week viewed it as a "diverse but largely dance-orientated album. It includes more gentle reggae stuff but also some techno and house." He felt that "nothing here compares favourably" with "All That She Wants", "though if the right tracks are picked and remixed there are more hits."

Track listing

Notes
 signifies a co-producer
 signifies re-editing
 signifies rap lyrics
 signifies pre-production
 signifies a remixer

Release history

Charts

Weekly charts

Year-end charts

Certifications and sales

See also
 List of best-selling albums in France
 List of best-selling albums in Germany
 List of best-selling albums
 List of diamond-certified albums in Canada
 List of number-one albums of 1994 (U.S.)
 List of UK Albums Chart number ones of the 1990s

References

Ace of Base albums
1993 debut albums
Edel-Mega Records albums